Vofopitant (GR205171) is a drug which acts as an NK1 receptor antagonist. It has antiemetic effects as with other NK1 antagonists, and also shows anxiolytic actions in animals. It was studied for applications such as the treatment of social phobia and post-traumatic stress disorder, but did not prove sufficiently effective to be marketed.

See also 
 NK1 receptor antagonist

References 

Antiemetics
NK1 receptor antagonists
Amines
Phenol ethers
Tetrazoles
Trifluoromethyl compounds
Abandoned drugs